Lozen Mountain (Lozenska planina) is a small mountain in Bulgaria. It is at the westernmost end of the Sredna Gora range. To the west, it is separated by the Pancharevo Gorge from the Vitosha and Plana mountains. To the north, its foothills descend into the Sofia Valley. Its highest point is Popov Dyal, . It is named after the village of Lozen.

References 

Mountains of Bulgaria
Landforms of Sofia City Province